The hexagonal tortoise problem was invented by Korean aristocrat and mathematician Choi Seok-jeong (1646–1715).  It is a mathematical problem that involves a hexagonal lattice, like the hexagonal pattern on some tortoises' shells, to the (N) vertices of which must be assigned integers (from 1 to N) in such a way that the sum of all integers at the vertices of each hexagon is the same.  The problem has apparent similarities to a magic square although it is a vertex-magic format rather than an edge-magic form or the more typical rows-of-cells form.

His book, Gusuryak, contains many mathematical discoveries.

References

Sources used 

 

Recreational mathematics
Magic shapes